Eoophyla cervinalis is a moth in the family Crambidae. It was described by Speidel in 2003. It is found on the island of Mindanao in the Philippines.

References

Eoophyla
Moths described in 2003